The 1994–95 World Series was a One Day International (ODI) cricket quadrangular where Australia played host to England and Zimbabwe. A development team Australia A also took part in the tournament. Australia and Australia A reached the finals, which Australia won 2–0. The matches involving Australia A were not classified as official One Day Internationals.

Background
Initially the tournament was only consisted of a tri-nation series with the schedule being revealed on 21 October 1993 with the three teams playing each other four times which started on 2 December with England taking on Zimbabwe and ending on 12 January before a three match final series which would go from the 15 to 19 January.

Squads

 = Played for Australia and for Australia A during the tournament

Points table

Result summary  
ICC ruled beforehand that matches involving Australia A should not be regarded as official internationals.

Final series
Australia won the best of three final series against Australia A 2–0.

Notes

External links
 Series home at Cricinfo

References

Australian Tri-Series
1994 in Australian cricket
1994 in English cricket
1994 in Zimbabwean cricket
1995 in Australian cricket
1995 in English cricket
1995 in Zimbabwean cricket
1994–95 Australian cricket season
1994-95
International cricket competitions from 1994–95 to 1997
1994-95